30th New York Film Critics Circle Awards
January 23, 1965(announced December 28, 1964)

My Fair Lady
The 30th New York Film Critics Circle Awards, honored the best filmmaking of 1964.

Winners
Best Actor:
Rex Harrison - My Fair Lady
Best Actress:
Kim Stanley - Séance on a Wet Afternoon
Best Director:
Stanley Kubrick - Dr. Strangelove or: How I Learned to Stop Worrying and Love the Bomb
Best Film:
My Fair Lady
Best Foreign Language Film:
That Man from Rio (L'homme de Rio) • Italy/France
Best Screenplay:
Harold Pinter - The Servant
Special Award
To Be Alive!

References

External links
1964 Awards

1964
New York Film Critics Circle Awards, 1964
New York Film Critics Circle Awards
New York Film Critics Circle Awards
New York Film Critics Circle Awards
New York Film Critics Circle Awards